Zeng Xianyi (January 31, 1936 – January 15, 2011) was a professor of legal history and was the dean of Renmin University of China Law School.

Biography
Zeng Xianyi received his Bachelor of Laws degree from Renmin University of China Department of Law in 1960.  He became the head of the department from 1990 to 1994 and then dean of the law school until 2005. He was then given the title of Honorary Dean of the law school.

Zeng died in Beijing on January 15, 2011.

References

External links
 Zeng Xianyi's profile at Renmin University of China Law School's website

1936 births
2011 deaths
Chinese legal scholars
Renmin University of China alumni
Academic staff of Renmin University of China